Armenta is a surname. Notable people with the surname include:

Alberto Carrillo Armenta (born 1954), Mexican politician
David Armenta (born 1950), American politician
Eduardo Armenta (born 2001), Mexican footballer 
Francisco Arce Armenta (born 1981), Mexican boxer